
Gmina Jordanów is a rural gmina (administrative district) in Sucha County, Lesser Poland Voivodeship, in southern Poland. Its seat is the town of Jordanów, although the town is not part of the territory of the gmina.

Villages
Gmina Jordanów contains the villages and settlements of Łętownia, Naprawa, Osielec, Toporzysko and Wysoka.

Neighbouring gminas
Gmina Jordanów is bordered by the town of Jordanów and by the gminas of Bystra-Sidzina, Lubień, Maków Podhalański, Raba Wyżna, Spytkowice and Tokarnia.

References
Polish official population figures 2006

Jordanow
Sucha County